Sensation Hunters may refer to:

 Sensation Hunters (1933 film), an American film directed by Charles Vidor
 Sensation Hunters (1945 film), an American film directed by Christy Cabanne